Ephram II (died 1770) was a Greek writer. He was born in Athens. He was Greek Orthodox Patriarch of Jerusalem (1766 – April 26, 1770).

1770 deaths
18th-century Greek Orthodox Patriarchs of Jerusalem
Writers from Athens
18th-century Greek clergy
Year of birth unknown